Sapiah was the leader of the Southern Ute tribe from 1880 until his death in 1936. He was born around 1840, the child of a Moache Ute father and an Apache mother, in the Ute lands before settlements. He was recognized as Chief of the Mauche and Servero Bands and Principal Chief of the Capote. He succeeded Chief Ouray as the official treaty negotiator. He learned English and took the "white man's name" Charles Buck, but he was best known as Buckskin Charley (also spelled Buckskin Charlie). He led the rescue of women and children who were abducted during the Meeker Massacre. In 1890, he was given the Rutherford Hayes Indian Peace Medal by President Benjamin Harrison. He rode with Geronimo in Theodore Roosevelt's 1905 Inaugural Parade. His son, Antonio Buck Sr., succeeded him as hereditary chief and became the first elected chairman of the Southern Ute tribe.

References

External links

 Vallecito Stories

1840s births
1936 deaths
19th-century Native Americans
20th-century Native Americans
Native American leaders
Ute people